Dani Olivier (born 1969) is a French photographer. He has graduated from the business school HEC Paris.
He started photography as a teenager in an informal, weekly photography club in Paris. Between 2000 and 2006, Olivier worked on digital self-portraits. He asked his models to use a digital camera to shoot their first nude selfies. He aimed to capture a unique moment that could not be reproduced: a person's very first selfie, long before the concept became popular.

From 2007 on, Olivier has specialized on abstract nude, compositions that he achieved by projecting patterns on his models, coupled with movement and optical deformations. He is using a minimal design ("a body, a black backdrop and lights") coupled with top-notch, state-of-the-art light projectors and cameras.

Books 
 Nus abstraits (2011),  
 Nus abstraits et psychédéliques (2011), 
 Nus corps et âme (2015)

Selected exhibitions 
 Kiev, Ukraine, 2010 and 2012: at the Found Art Gallery
 Paris, France, 2012: At the Art and Events Gallery
 Moscow, Russia, 2012:  LUX Exhibition
 Arles, France, 2015: Voies off (fringe festival) “Nude Body and Soul” 
 Paris, France, 2015: La quatrième image
 Los Angeles, USA, 2015, MOPLA (Month of Photography Los Angeles 2015)
 Arles, France, 2015: Voies off photo festival - exhibition “Nude Body and Soul” 
 Paris, France, October 2015: "La quatrième image" photo festival
 Paris, France, November 2015 : Fotofever Paris Art Fair 2015 (solo-show)
 Los Angeles, USA, January 2016 : photoLA 2016 (solo-show)
 Basel, Switzerland, March 2016 : Exhibition at BaselWorld 
 Paris, France, April 2016 : exhibition at Costes Hotel
 Paris, France, June 2016 : exhibition at ArtPhotoBy gallery
 Paris, France, November 2016 : Fotofever Paris 2016 art fair (solo-show)
 Brussels, Belgium, May-November 2017 : exhibition at the M-E-M Museum
 Arles, France, juillet-août 2017 : Voies off photo festival - Exhibition "Women of Light"
 Saint-Tropez, July–August 2017 : exhibitions at Nikki Beach Saint-Tropez and at Brasserie des Arts
 Villeréal, France, August 2017 : Guest of honour at FocaleNuArt photo festival 
 Paris, France, September 2017-January 2018 : exhibition at Bar 153
 Paris, France, November 2017 : Fotofever Paris Art Fair 2017 (solo-show)
 Saint-Denis, France, November 2017, Guest of honour of the 61st festival of"Union des Arts Plastiques de Saint-Denis"

References

External links 
 Dani Olivier's website

French photographers
1969 births
Place of birth missing (living people)
Living people
HEC Paris alumni